Horstville is an unincorporated community in Yuba County, California.

A post office operated at Horstville from 1898 to 1901.  The name is in honor of E. Clemens Horst, local rancher.

Horstville is also home of Horst Fellner's Hannes Ranch, (in earlier times owned by Bing Crosby (one of his many ranches))

Notes

References

Unincorporated communities in California
Unincorporated communities in Yuba County, California